Martin Hägglund (born 23 November 1976) is a Swedish philosopher and scholar of modernist literature. He is the Birgit Baldwin Professor of Humanities at Yale University. He is also a member of the Harvard Society of Fellows, serving as a Junior Fellow from 2009 to 2012. Hägglund is the author of This Life: Secular Faith and Spiritual Freedom (2019), Dying for Time: Proust, Woolf, Nabokov (2012), Radical Atheism: Derrida and the Time of Life (2008), and Kronofobi: Essäer om tid och ändlighet (Chronophobia: Essays on Time and Finitude, 2002). He was awarded a Guggenheim Fellowship in 2018 and won the René Wellek Prize in 2020.

Works

This Life (2019)
In This Life: Secular Faith and Spiritual Freedom (2019), Hägglund pursues a critique of the religious ideal of eternity and reconceives faith in secular terms as the fundamental form of practical commitment. Through new interpretations of G.W.F. Hegel, Karl Marx, and Martin Luther King Jr., Hägglund develops the social and political stakes of his analysis of our temporal existence, arguing that labor under capitalism alienates us from our finite lifetime. Calling for a revaluation of our values, Hägglund presents a vision of democratic socialism as a post-capitalist form of life in which we could truly own our time and recognize our shared freedom.

Dying for Time (2012)
Dying for Time offers new readings of the problem of temporality in the writings of Marcel Proust, Virginia Woolf, and Vladimir Nabokov. Through an engagement with Sigmund Freud and Jacques Lacan, Hägglund also develops an original theory of the relation between time and desire ("chronolibido"), addressing mourning and melancholia, pleasure and pain, attachment and loss.

Radical Atheism (2008)
Radical Atheism is a major intervention in deconstruction, offering a novel account of Jacques Derrida's thinking of time and space, life and death, good and evil, self and other. As Hägglund argues, all our commitments presuppose an investment in and care for finite life. Developing a deconstructive account of time, Hägglund shows how Derrida rethinks the constitution of identity, ethics, religion, and political emancipation in accordance with the condition of temporal finitude.

Bibliography
 This Life: Secular Faith and Spiritual Freedom, Pantheon Books, 2019.
 Dying for Time: Proust, Woolf, Nabokov, Cambridge, MA: Harvard University Press, 2012.
 Radical Atheism: Derrida and the Time of Life, Stanford: Stanford University Press, Meridian: Crossing Aesthetics, 2008.
 Kronofobi: Essäer om tid och ändlighet (Chronophobia: Essays on Time and Finitude), Stockholm/Stehag: Brutus Östlings Bokförlag Symposion, 2002.

References

External links
Review of This Life in The New Yorker
Review of This Life in Radical Philosophy
Review of Dying for Time in Los Angeles Review of Books
Review of Radical Atheism and its reception in International Journal of Philosophical Studies
Review of This Life in The New Republic
Review of This Life in boundary 2.
Video recording of Hägglund and Derek Attridge on Radical Atheism at Oxford University
Symposium on This Life in Los Angeles Review of Books (2020)
Response essay by Hägglund: "Marx, Hegel, and the Critique of Religion" (2021)
Martin Hägglund’s website

Swedish literary scholars
Literary theorists
Deconstruction
1976 births
Living people
Cornell University people
21st-century Swedish philosophers
Continental philosophers
Atheist philosophers
Harvard Fellows